Sultan Muhammad (1418 – 1452) was the Timurid ruler of Persia and Fars from around 1447 until his death. He was the son of Baysunghur son of Shah Rukh.

During the last years of Shah Rukh's reign, Sultan Muhammad raised a revolt in the western provinces of the Timurid Empire. Shah Rukh was able to stop the revolt and capture many of its supporters in 1446, but Sultan Muhammad took refuge in Luristan. Following his grandfather's death, Sultan Muhammad returned from Luristan and from there assumed control of central Persia. Together with his half-brother Abul-Qasim Babur Mirza of Khurasan and uncle Ulugh Beg of Transoxiana, he became one of the three most powerful rulers of the splintering empire.

Sultan Muhammad, eager to expand his domain, soon started a war with Mirza Abul-Qasim Babur and invaded Khurasan. At first the campaign went well; in 1450 he defeated his brother at Mashhad, following which the latter yielded some of his lands to him. Things soon turned south, however, and he was captured by Mirza Abul-Qasim Babur, who had him executed. Mirza Abul-Qasim Babur then took over Sultan Muhammad's territories, but soon lost them to the Qara Qoyunlu Turkmen under Jahan Shah. His son was Yadgar Muhammad Mirza, who would become ruler of Khorasan for 6 weeks.

Personal life
Wives
Agha Begi, daughter of Yusuf Tarkhan
Tundi Begi
Tutuq 'Ismat, daughter of Jahan Shah, ruler of the Qara Qoyunlu

Issue
Yadgar Muhammad Mirza (by Tundi Begi)
Ulugh Agha (by Agha Begi)

References
Roemer, H. R. "The Successors of Timur." The Cambridge History of Iran, Volume 6: The Timurid and Safavid Periods. Ed. Peter Jackson. New York, New York: Cambridge University Press, 1986. 
Stevens, John. The history of Persia. Containing, the lives and memorable actions of its kings from the first erecting of that monarchy to this time; an exact Description of all its Dominions; a curious Account of India, China, Tartary, Kermon, Arabia, Nixabur, and the Islands of Ceylon and Timor; as also of all Cities occasionally mention'd, as Schiras, Samarkand, Bokara, &c. Manners and Customs of those People, Persian Worshippers of Fire; Plants, Beasts, Product, and Trade. With many instructive and pleasant digressions, being remarkable Stories or Passages, occasionally occurring, as Strange Burials; Burning of the Dead; Liquors of several Countries; Hunting; Fishing; Practice of Physick; famous Physicians in the East; Actions of Tamerlan, &c. To which is added, an abridgment of the lives of the kings of Harmuz, or Ormuz. The Persian history written in Arabick, by Mirkond, a famous Eastern Author that of Ormuz, by Torunxa, King of that Island, both of them translated into Spanish, by Antony Teixeira, who liv'd several Years in Persia and India; and now render'd into English.

Timurid monarchs
1451 deaths
Year of birth unknown